Fever Season is the seventh extended play (EP) by South Korean girl group GFriend. It was released by Source Music on July 1, 2019, and distributed by kakao M. It debuted at number 10 on the Billboard World Albums chart. A music video was released for "Fever".

Promotion
The group promoted the single "Fever" in several music shows having received 7 music shows wins with the single during the promotion of the EP.

Production and composition 

"Fever" was released as the lead single in conjunction with the EP on July 1, 2019.

All GFriend members participated in writing lyrics for the song "Hope" with Lee Won-jong.

The EP includes the song the Korean version of the group's third Japanese single "Flower".

Commercial performance
The EP debuted at number one on South Korea's Gaon Album Chart becoming the group's 4th album to achieve

Track listing

Charts

Album

Year-end charts

Single
"Fever"

Accolades

References

2019 EPs
Korean-language EPs
GFriend EPs
Kakao M EPs
Hybe Corporation EPs